Ta Mara and the Seen was an American R&B group based in Minneapolis. They were signed by A&M Records to capitalize on the mid-1980s chart success of the "Minneapolis sound", which included acts such as Prince, Vanity 6, Sheila E., and the Time. They achieved Top 40 success with the single "Everybody Dance", which peaked at No. 24 on Billboard Hot 100 chart in early 1986.  Other tracks from their self-titled debut album include the single "Affection", "Summertime Love", and a ballad titled "Long Cold Nights".  The album was produced by former Time guitarist Jesse Johnson.  The group was managed by Owen Husney. A 1988 follow-up album, Blueberry Gossip, failed to catch on and the group disbanded in 1989. Their albums are no longer in print.

Lead singer Margaret Cox (a.k.a. Margie Cox), given the stage name Pegi Ta Mara by producer Johnson, was born in Kenitra, Morocco and lived there until age seven, when she and her family moved to Minneapolis. Other members of the group included bassist Keith Woodson, guitarist Oliver Leiber (son of the songwriter Jerry Leiber), keyboardist Gina Fellicetta, and drummer Jamie Chez.

Discography

Albums
Ta Mara & the Seen (1985), A&M
Blueberry Gossip (1988), A&M

Singles
"Everybody Dance" (1985) – U.S. Billboard Hot 100 No. 24, U.S. R&B Singles No. 3, U.S. Dance/Disco No. 17
"Affection" (1985) U.S. R&B No. 19
"Thinking About You" (1986) U.S. R&B No. 85
"Blueberry Gossip" (1988) U.S. R&B No. 54
"True Ecstasy" (1988)
"Everyday People" (1988)

External links

Musical groups from Minnesota
American rhythm and blues musical groups